The 2014 season of the World Kabaddi League was its first edition. The season started on 9 August 2014.

London, UK

Birmingham, UK

Standings

References

External links
 
 Collected news and commentary at The Times of India

World League